Widow's benefit may refer to various components of the social security system in the United Kingdom:

Widow’s Pension
Widowed Parent's Allowance
Widowed Mother’s Allowance
Bereavement benefit

Social security in the United Kingdom
Widowhood in the United Kingdom